Only as the Day Is Long is the second album by singer-songwriter Sera Cahoone, released March 18, 2008, on Sub Pop Records.

Track list
"You Might as Well" – 3:12
"Baker Lake" – 4:09
"Only as the Day Is Long" – 3:56
"Runnin' Your Way" – 3:24
"Shitty Hotel" – 3:56
"You're Not Broken" – 5:40
"The Colder the Air" – 3:36
"Tryin'" – 3:09
"Happy When I'm Gone" – 3:20
"Seven Hours Later" – 4:15

Personnel
 Sera Cahoone – guitar, vocals
 Jeff Fielder – banjo, dobro, guitar, vocals
 Jonas Haskins – bass guitar
 Jason Kardong – pedal steel guitar
 Jason Merculief – drums

References

External links
 

Sub Pop albums
2008 albums
Sera Cahoone albums